Statistics of Swiss Super League in the 1925–26 season.

East

Table

Results

Central

Table

Results

West

Table

Results

Final

Table

Results 

|colspan="3" style="background-color:#D0D0D0" align=center|13 June 1926

|-
|colspan="3" style="background-color:#D0D0D0" align=center|20 June 1926

|-
|colspan="3" style="background-color:#D0D0D0" align=center|27 June 1926

Championship play-off 

|colspan="3" style="background-color:#D0D0D0" align=center|4 July 1926

Servette Genf won the championship.

Sources 
 Switzerland 1925-26 at RSSSF

Swiss Football League seasons
1925–26 in Swiss football
Swiss